Joseph Aubrey "John" Faircloth Jr. (born February 19, 1939) is a Republican member of the North Carolina House of Representatives. He has represented the 62nd district (and its preceding 61st district) since 2011. The district covers parts of western Guilford County.

Faircloth has a bachelor's degree from Guilford College a master's degree from the University of North Carolina at Greensboro and has also studied at the University of North Carolina at Chapel Hill and the University of Louisville. Faircloth spent his career as a police officer.  He was police chief of Salisbury, North Carolina from 1975 to 1976 and of High Point, North Carolina from 1976 to 1992. Since 1992 he has worked as a real estate agent. Faircloth was first elected to the General Assembly in 2010.

Political career
Faircloth represented HD61 from 2011-2019 and HD62 since 2019. 
In 2010 “Faircloth’s top three issues are protecting a free-market economy from excessive government control and influence, providing good public safety, and strengthening public education.” Faircloth defeated Democrat Brandon Gray in the 2020 election.

Political positions
Faircloth was a primary sponsor of H937, which allowed permit holders to carry concealed firearms inside bars and restaurants that serve alcohol and to keep firearms locked in their car when parked on college or public school campuses. H937 allowed concealed handgun permit holders to keep their “firearms locked in their car when parked on college or public school campuses.” Faircloth said the college provision “merely makes legal something that already happens” and "let's don't fool ourselves, there are guns on our campuses." Faircloth on concealed carry holders consuming alcohol at a bar or restaurant: “It’s a very overblown concern.” Faircloth was also a sponsor of H405, which “would allow prosecutors and judges with concealed-carry permits to bring handguns into courthouses.” In 2013, Faircloth sponsored a bill that would have allowed juveniles 15 years of age or older who committed high level felonies to be tried in superior court. The age was originally set at 13, but Faircloth raised it after stakeholder input.

Committee assignments

2021-2022 session
Appropriations (Chair)
Appropriations - Justice and Public Safety (Vice Chair)
Election Law and Campaign Finance Reform
Local Government
Judiciary III
Transportation

2019-2020 session
Appropriations (Chair)
Appropriations - Justice and Public Safety (Vice Chair)
Election Law and Campaign Finance Reform
State and Local Government
Judiciary
Transportation

2017-2018 session
Appropriations (Chair)
Ethics (Chair)
Judiciary II (Vice Chair)
Elections and Ethics Law
Transportation
State Personnel

2015-2016 session
Appropriations (Vice Chair)
Appropriations - Justice and Public Safety (Chair)
Ethics (Chair)
Judiciary II (Vice Chair)
Elections
Local Government
Transportation

2013-2014 session
Appropriations (Vice Chair)
Judiciary
Elections
Government
Transportation

2011-2012 session
Appropriations
Judiciary
Elections
Government
Transportation

Electoral history

2020

2018

2016

2014

2012

2010

References

External links
North Carolina assembly bio
Faircloth campaign bio
Project Vote Smart bio of Faircloth

|-

Living people
1939 births
People from Greensboro, North Carolina
People from High Point, North Carolina
Guilford College alumni
University of North Carolina at Greensboro alumni
University of North Carolina at Chapel Hill alumni
University of Louisville alumni
American municipal police chiefs
21st-century American politicians
Republican Party members of the North Carolina House of Representatives
Grimsley High School alumni